Urogymnus is a genus of stingrays in the family Dasyatidae from marine, brackish and freshwater habitats in the Indo-Pacific and tropical East Atlantic regions. The genus was previously considered to be monotypic, containing only the porcupine ray (U. asperrimus). Molecular phylogenetic research published in 2016 reassigned several species from Himantura to Urogymnus.

Species
Urogymnus acanthobothrium Last, White & Kyne, 2016 (Mumburarr whipray)
Urogymnus asperrimus (Bloch & J. G. Schneider, 1801) (Porcupine ray)
Urogymnus dalyensis (Last & Manjaji-Matsumoto, 2008) (Freshwater whipray)
Urogymnus granulatus (Macleay, 1883) (Mangrove whipray)
Urogymnus lobistoma (Manjaji-Matsumoto & Last, 2006) (Tubemouth whipray)
Urogymnus polylepis (Bleeker, 1852) (Giant freshwater stingray)
Urogymnus africana (Bloch & Schneider, 1801)
Urogymnus africanus (Bloch & Schneider, 1801)
Urogymnus natalensis (Gilchrist & Thompson, 1911)
Urogymnus poecilura (Shaw, 1804)
Urogymnus rhombeus Klunzinger, 1871
Urogymnus ukpam (Smith, 1863)

References

 
Dasyatidae
Taxa named by Johannes Peter Müller
Taxa named by Friedrich Gustav Jakob Henle
Taxonomy articles created by Polbot